= Debbie Das =

Transgender activist and motivational speaker based in India

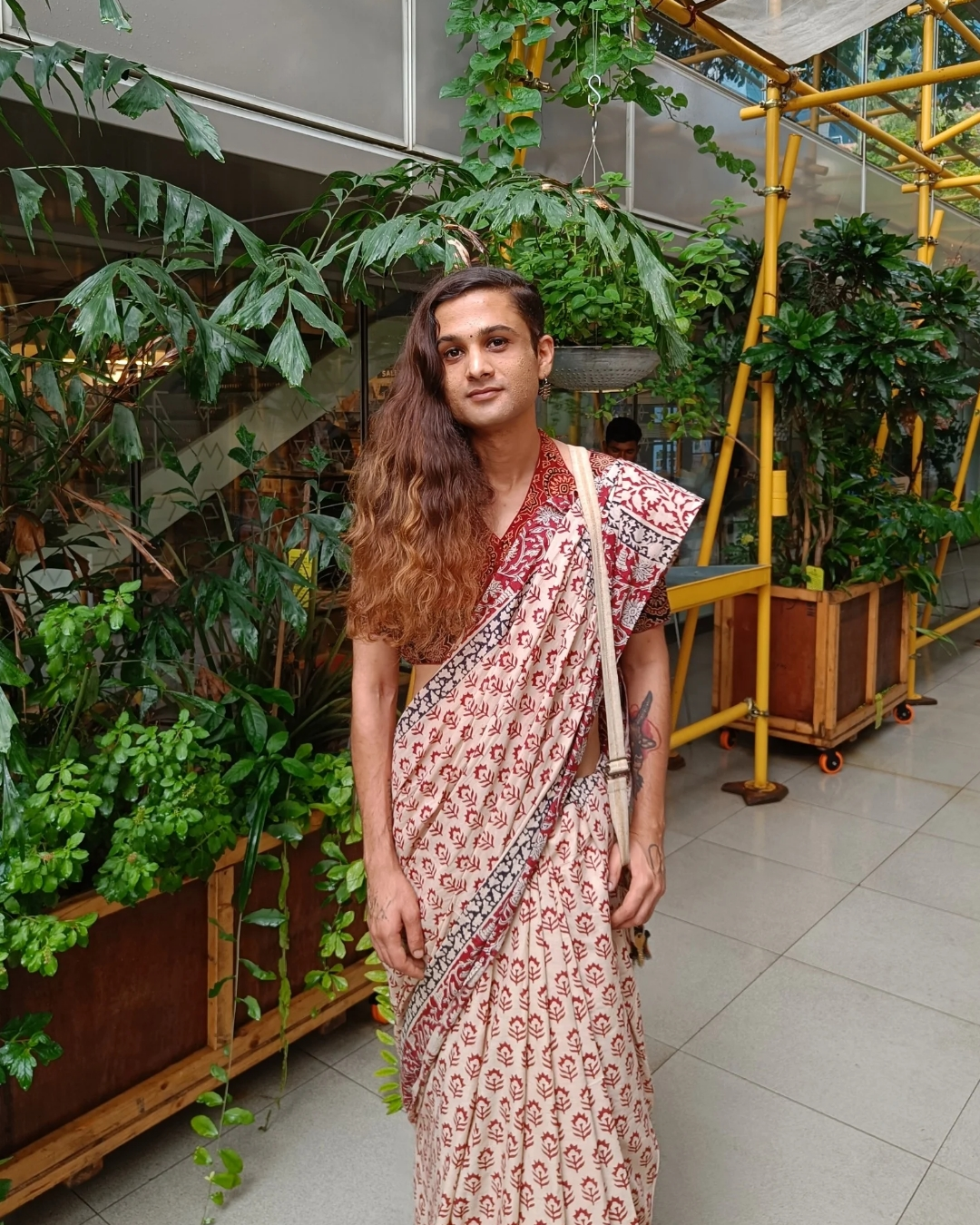
- Debbie Das at a Lit conference
- Born: Hyderabad, India
- Occupations: Transgender rights activist; Designer; Writer

Debbie Das is an Indian transgender rights activist, public speaker, writer, graphic designer, and brand consultant based in Hyderabad, India.

== For&Bi ==
She is the founder of For&Bi, a queer collective that organizes alcohol- and drug-free community spaces and advocates for equitable opportunities for LGBTQIA+ people. Das has delivered talks on diversity, equity, and inclusion (DEI), disability rights, and gender justice for educational institutions and corporate organizations.

== Writing ==
In addition to her advocacy, Das writes on issues relating to transgender identity, gender expression, disability, and social inclusion. Her essays have appeared on Medium, where she has written about the experiences of transgender people in India, including topics such as visibility, discrimination, and gender identity. She has also been involved in community-building initiatives and public discussions on transgender rights and intersectionality.

== Activism ==
In 2026, Debbie Das vocally participated in public discussions surrounding India's Transgender Persons (Protection of Rights) Amendment Bill, particularly its implications for gender recognition, healthcare and the wider trans community. She has also been involved in community-oriented initiatives, including Chai Hona, a free monthly queer gathering in Hyderabad that she helped design with Kali and others, providing an accessible space for queer people to meet and build community.

In Bengaluru, Das involved in the revival of a community-support initiative providing direct assistance to transgender people following the 2026 legislation. Her work has addressed discrimination within the design industry and the challenges faced by transgender people in accessing gender-affirming healthcare.

In July 2026, she addressed that uncertainty surrounding the new legal framework had led to postpone starting hormone-replacement therapy, reflecting broader concerns among transgender people about continuity and accessibility of healthcare. She also participated in a March 2026 Community Support Circle at the Museum of Art & Photography in Bengaluru, where she facilitated an art-based grounding session for trans and non-binary participants affected by anxieties surrounding the legislation.
